Guacamelee! 2 is a Metroidvania platform video game developed and published by DrinkBox Studios. A sequel to Guacamelee!, the game was released for PlayStation 4 and Windows in August 2018 while the Nintendo Switch version was released on December 10. The Xbox One version was released on January 18, 2019. The game received generally positive reviews upon release.

Gameplay
Guacamelee! 2 is a Metroidvania platform game. The player controls Juan Aguacate, a luchador who fights with punches, kicks, and wrestling grapples. Over the course of the game, Juan re-acquires many of his powers from the previous game, many of which have both combat and movement applications - for example the Rooster Uppercut, which grants vertical mobility while also attacking enemies overhead and breaking like-coloured obstacles. Each special move is associated with a color, which surrounds Juan whenever he uses them. For example, the Rooster Uppercut is associated with red. Whenever Juan uses it, his outline turns red. He also learns new tricks from completing challenges set by trainers found throughout the world, such as more damaging attacks or additional health. The most drastic change is the chicken transformation - while in the previous game it was only for traversing small corridors, it now has an entire fighting moveset of its own with unique special moves. There are also challenge rooms for players to explore. The game can be played solo or cooperatively with three other players. The game features more enemy types, abilities and larger maps when compared with its predecessor.

Story
The game begins with a simplified version of the first game's final confrontation with the world-rending Calaca, leading into the true ending where the luchador Juan successfully saves the life of El Presidente's Daughter, Lupita. Seven years later, the two are married and live with two children, with Juan having grown out of shape. Black clouds begin to appear in the village, followed by Juan's mentor Uay Chivo appearing to tell him the entire "Mexiverse" is in danger. He brings Juan through a portal to "The Darkest Timeline", where the source of the trouble is. In this timeline, Juan and Lupita were killed by Calaca, who was defeated by another luchador called Salvador. In the seven years since, Salvador has become corrupted by the power of his mask, and now wishes to collect three relics so he can access the Sacred Guacamole in the realm of El Otromundo and become all-powerful. However, by beginning to collect the relics, he has caused the timelines to destabilize, which will mean the end of all timelines if he is not stopped.

Juan is led to reunite with Tostada, the Guardian of the Mask, so he can be restored to fighting form. They begin to travel the world to stop Salvador and his underlings from collecting the relics, but ultimately fail, and Salvador successfully gets to the Sacred Guacamole. However, Juan eventually defeats him, which destroys Salvador's mask and results in his death. The timelines are restored and the Mexiverse is saved, but this prevents Juan from returning to his own timeline. Recalling an earlier conversation, where it's said that El Otromundo connects all the timelines together, he leaps back into El Otromundo before the way closes and looks out across the great many indistinguishable portals.

In the normal ending, Juan's family awaits his return for many years, before he eventually appears. In the true ending, attained if the player clears the Chicken Illuminati's crucible and meets the Holy Hen, Juan recalls her advice and removes his mask, immediately identifying the correct portal and returning to his family without delay.

Development
The game was developed by DrinkBox Studios. Unlike its predecessor, the game was not released for the PlayStation Vita as DrinkBox opted to use the PlayStation 4 as the base platform to utilize its new rendering engine. The team prototyped different moves for Juan. However, they decided to retain all the moves from the original as they felt that they were more intuitive than the new ones created. With Guacamelee! 2, the studio was able to revisit ideas that were scrapped during the development of the first game, and expand on the existing mechanics and systems.

The game was announced at Paris Games Week by Sony Interactive Entertainment in October 2017. It was released for PlayStation 4 and Windows on August 21, 2018. DrinkBox released the Nintendo Switch version on December 10, 2018.

Reception

The game received generally favourable reviews according to review aggregator Metacritic.

It was nominated for "Control Design, 2D or Limited 3D" and "Game, Franchise Action" at the National Academy of Video Game Trade Reviewers Awards.

References

External links
 

2018 video games
Action video games
Cooperative video games
DrinkBox Studios games
Indie video games
Metroidvania games
Multiplayer and single-player video games
Nintendo Switch games
Platform games
PlayStation 4 games
Side-scrolling video games
Video game sequels
Video games developed in Canada
Video games scored by Rom Di Prisco
Video games set in Mexico
Windows games
Xbox Cloud Gaming games
Xbox One games